Moss Lane is a cricket ground in Moss Lane, Alderley Edge, Cheshire. The ground is surrounded on all four sides by residential housing. The ground is used by Alderley Edge Cricket Club. It is also a venue for tennis, squash and field hockey.

History
The ground was established in 1870, with Cheshire first playing there in the 1973 Minor Counties Championship against the Lancashire Second XI. Cheshire played two further Minor Counties Championship matches there, in 1975 and 1977, as well as playing there once in the 1980s when they played Durham in the same competition. Minor counties cricket did not return to the ground until 1998, when Cheshire played Shropshire in the Minor Counties Championship. Since then, Cheshire have played one match per–year at the ground. The ground held its first List A match in 2004, when Cheshire played first-class opponents Hampshire in the second round of the Cheltenham & Gloucester Trophy, with Hampshire winning due to half centuries by William Kendall and Dimitri Mascarenhas, as well as three wickets from Lawrence Prittipaul. The ground held a second List A match in 2008 when Lancashire played the touring Bangladesh A. Despite a fifty from Tamim Iqbal, the tourists lost the match by six wickets, with Francois du Plessis scoring 93 not out in the chase.

Records

List A
 Highest team total: 273/8 (50 overs) by Hampshire v Cheshire, 2004
 Lowest team total: 182 all out (45.5 overs) by Bangladesh A v Lancashire, 2008
 Highest individual innings: 93* by Francois du Plessis for Lancashire v Bangladesh A, 2008
 Best bowling in an innings: 4/45 by Jason Whittaker for Cheshire v Hampshire, 2004

Gallery

See also
List of cricket grounds in England and Wales

References

External links

Moss Lane at CricketArchive
Moss Lane at ESPNcricinfo

Cricket grounds in Cheshire
Cheshire County Cricket Club
Sports venues completed in 1870